Vennu Mallesh is an Indian singer from Achampet, Telangana who is best known for his songs on YouTube.

Career
Vennu Mallesh is known for his song "It's My Life Whatever I Wanna Do", which was released in July 2012 on YouTube. The video has over 29 million views as of November 2022.

Critical reception
The Hindustan Times referred to Mallesh's videos as "mind-numbingly cringeworthy". It later said that Mallesh and others like him "are all ordinary folk who have relied on YouTube videos to attain the stardom they enjoy today. This makes them more relatable and engaging."

The Quint wrote: "The cringe pop genre has seen singers like Taher Shah and Vennu Mallesh attain cult following."

Popspoken wrote: "Vennu is a fascinating musical powerhouse originating from the beautiful India. His first masterpiece 'It's My Life' has exceeded 10 million views, and he's right on track to becoming a viral sensation."  

The Huffington Post wrote: "In Summer 2012's pantheon of viral hits, the singer's first song is but a minor deity, but to him, it's a personal creedo".

Discography

References

External links
 

Living people
Indian YouTubers
Singers from Hyderabad, India
1984 births
Outsider musicians
YouTube channels launched in 2008